Kalevi Kustaa Mattila (11 November 1934 – 5 November 2022) was a Finnish politician. A member of the Centre Party, he served in the Parliament from 1975 to 1995.

Mattila died in Ylivieska on 5 November 2022 at the age of 87.

References

1934 births
2022 deaths
Members of the Parliament of Finland
People from Ylivieska